Gun Interactive (formerly Gun Media; stylized as Gun.) is an American video game publisher based in Lexington, Kentucky. It was founded by Ronnie Hobbs and Wes Keltner in 2010.

History 
Gun Interactive was founded by Ronnie Hobbs and Wes Keltner in 2010.

The company started operations in 2012. On July 17, 2013, the company's first title, Breach & Clear was released, along with its sequel Deadline on July 21, 2015.

On November 25, 2015, Gun Media released their first console game, Speakeasy, on the PlayStation 4. The game received a 3/10 from GameSpot  and is no longer available on the PlayStation Network.

In 2015, Randy Greenback, the company's Executive Producer and Director created two campaigns for Friday the 13th: The Game, Kickstarter and BackerKit. Earlier, Friday the 13th director Sean S. Cunningham approached the team and offered the team the video game license, to which they accepted. The game was originally developed by Denver-based studio IllFonic under the name Slasher Vol. 1: Summer Camp, but was revealed as the new game with release delayed from October 2015 to 2016.

In January 2016, both IllFonic and Gun Media spoke at a developer panel at PAX South and premiered in-engine alpha footage and a list of kill animations there, and premiering a gameplay demo at E3 2016 in June, scheduling the game for release in October 2016. In September 2021, Gun Media rebranded as Gun Interactive.

Games

References

External links 
 

2010 establishments in Kentucky
American companies established in 2010
Companies based in Lexington, Kentucky
Privately held companies based in Kentucky
Video game companies established in 2010
Video game companies of the United States
Video game publishers